Crashlands is an action-adventure role-playing video game developed and published by Butterscotch Shenanigans. It was released on the App Store, Google Play and Steam in January 2016. Shortly after release, software pirates had uploaded the game to Amazon without permission. The game is described as being a "story-driven crafting game" and tasks players to collect items in order to craft items such as weapons and armour. Crashlands has been compared to Don't Starve.

Reception

The mobile and PC versions of the game hold aggregated scores of 93 out of 100 and 78 out of 100 on Metacritic, respectively. PC Gamer awarded it 73%, saying "Fun combat, great writing, and a great look, but with pacing and progression tuned for a mobile experience, not the PC."

References

External links
 

2016 video games
Action video games
Adventure games
Android (operating system) games
IOS games
Linux games
MacOS games
Nintendo Switch games
Windows games
Video games developed in the United States